The Tibetan Policy and Support Act is a federal law that outlines United States policy on Tibet.

Legislative history
On January 28, 2020, the bill passed the US House of Representatives by a vote of 392–22.

On December 21, 2020, the bill was approved by the U.S. Congress as an amendment to the Consolidated Appropriations Act, 2021.

On December 27, 2020, the bill was signed into law.

Legislation
The Tibetan Policy and Support Act would make it official United States policy that the succession of Tibetan Buddhist leaders, including the succession of the Dalai Lama, be left solely to Tibetan Buddhists to decide, without interference from the Chinese government. Chinese officials that interfere in the process of selecting Tibetan Buddhist leaders would be subject to sanctions under the Global Magnitsky Act, including denial of entry into the United States. The bill also calls for the creation of a new US consulate in Lhasa, the capital of the Tibet Autonomous Region.

Reactions

Domestic
The United States Commission on International Religious Freedom (USCIRF) commended the US House of Representatives for passing the act, which the USCIRF had previously endorsed.

Jim McGovern, Chair of the Tom Lantos Human Rights Commission and the Congressional-Executive Commission on China commented, "We are criticizing the Chinese Communist Party (CCP) and not the Chinese people, who are also suffering under China’s repression,... We stand in solidarity with the Tibetan people and revere His Holiness the Dalai Lama. We all are in this together and we expect the President to sign the Tibet Policy and Support Act into law soon."

Central Tibetan Administration
Lobsang Sangay, Sisur (Former President) of the Tibetan government-in-exile and graduate of the Harvard Law School, thanked the Government of the United States and the US House for passing The Tibetan Policy and Support Act.

China
Hua Chunying, China's Foreign Ministry spokesperson, said that the act severely violates the basic norms governing international relations and was the latest attempt to interfere in China's domestic affairs.

See also
 Uyghur Human Rights Policy Act

References

United States foreign relations legislation
Acts of the 116th United States Congress
Tibet–United States relations
China–United States relations